The Venetian regional election of 1985 took place on 12 May 1985.

Events
Christian Democracy was by far the largest party, but for the first time since 1970 it was not able to secure an outright majority. The Venetian League, which would have become a stable political force in the Region, entered for the first time the Regional Council with two regional deputies.

After the election Christian Democrat Carlo Bernini, the incumbent President of the Region, formed a government comprising also the Italian Socialist Party, the Italian Democratic Socialist Party and the Italian Liberal Party. In 1989 Bernini, appointed minister in Andreotti VI Cabinet, was replaced by Franco Cremonese, another Christian Democrat.

Results

Source: Regional Council of Veneto

References

Elections in Veneto
1985 elections in Italy